Ben Gurion International Airport , commonly known by the Hebrew-language acronym , is the main international airport of Israel. Situated on the northern outskirts of the city of Lod, it is the busiest airport in the country. Until 1973, it was known as Lod Airport, whereafter it was renamed in honour of David Ben-Gurion, the first Israeli prime minister. The airport serves as a hub for El Al, Israir Airlines, Arkia, and Sun d'Or, and is managed by the Israel Airports Authority.

In 2019, Ben Gurion Airport handled 24.8 million passengers. It is considered to be among the five best airports in the Middle East due to its passenger experience and its high level of security; while it has been the target of several terrorist attacks, no attempt to hijack a plane departing from Ben Gurion Airport has ever succeeded.

The airport holds extreme strategic importance to Israel as it is one of the few convenient entry points into the country for most travellers. As Ben Gurion Airport once held standalone significance, it was regarded as a single point of failure, which led to the opening of Ramon Airport in 2019.

History

British Mandate period (1934–1948)

The airport began during the British Mandate for Palestine as an airstrip of two unpaved runways on the outskirts of the town of Lydda (now Lod), near the Templer colony of Wilhelma. It was built in 1934, largely at the urging of Airwork Services. The first passenger service at the new airport was the Misr Airwork route Cairo—Lydda—Nicosia, inaugurated on 3 August 1935. Subsequently, Misr flew via Lydda to Haifa and Baghdad. The first continental European airline with a regular service to Lydda was LOT Polish Airlines since 4 April 1937. By that time, Lydda Airport boasted four fully operational concrete runways. Holland's KLM, which had since 1933 stopped at Gaza en route to Batavia, Dutch East Indies (now Jakarta, Indonesia), moved the service to Lydda in 1937. Imperial Airways, too, used Lydda as a refueling stop en route to India.

During World War II, Imperial Airways and later British Overseas Airways Corporation continued the service to Lydda until the fall of France in June 1940. When the Japanese military advanced into Burma and Malaya in February 1942, KLM curtailed its route to Batavia and made Lydda the eastern terminus of the route. Misr Airwork, which had suspended flights upon the British declaration of war, resumed the weekly Cairo—Lydda—Nicosia service in May 1940.

In 1943, the airport was renamed "RAF Station Lydda" and continued to serve as a major airfield for military air transport and aircraft ferry operations between military bases in Europe, Africa, the Middle East (mainly Iraq and Persia) and South/Southeast Asia. In 1944, as the German threat in the Middle East subsided, Aviron Aviation Company initiated service four times a week between Lydda and Haifa.

The first civilian transatlantic route, New York City to Lydda Airport, was inaugurated by TWA in 1946. The British gave up the airport at the end of April 1948.

Israel's first decades (1948–1973)

Soldiers of the Israel Defense Forces captured the airport on 10 July 1948, in Operation Danny, transferring control to the newly declared State of Israel. In 1948 the Israelis changed the official name of the  airport from Lydda to Lod (the nearby town's name in Hebrew), the airport's name becoming Lod Airport. Flights resumed on 24 November 1948. That year, 40,000 passengers passed through the terminal. By 1952, the number had risen to 100,000 a month. Within a decade, air traffic increased to the point where local flights had to be redirected to Tel Aviv's other airport, the Sde Dov airfield (SDV) on the city's northern coast. By the mid-1960s, 14 international airlines were landing at the airport.

The airport's name was changed from Lod to Ben Gurion International Airport in 1973 to honour Israel's first Prime Minister, David Ben-Gurion, who died that year.

Terrorist incidents (1972)
While Ben Gurion Airport has been a target of Palestinian attacks, the adoption of strict security precautions has ensured that no aircraft departing from Ben Gurion airport has ever been hijacked. On the other hand, airliners hijacked from other countries have landed at Ben Gurion, contributing to two major incidents in the airport's history.

In the first incident, on 8 May 1972, four Palestinian Black September terrorists hijacked a Sabena flight en route from Vienna and forced it to land at Ben Gurion airport. Sayeret Matkal commandos, including Benjamin Netanyahu, led by Ehud Barak (both future Israeli Prime Ministers) stormed the plane, killing two of the hijackers and capturing the other two. One passenger was killed.

Later that month, on 30 May 1972, in an attack known as the Lod Airport massacre, 24 people were killed and 80 injured when three members of the Japanese Red Army sprayed machine gun fire into the passenger arrival area. The victims included Aharon Katzir, a prominent protein biophysicist and brother of Israel's 4th president. Those injured included Efraim Katzir and a group of twenty Puerto Rican tourists who had just arrived in Israel. The only terrorist who survived was Kozo Okamoto, who received a life sentence but was released in 1985 as part of a prisoner exchange with the PFLP-GC.

Since the 1980s
More buildings and runways were added over the years, but with the onset of mass immigration from Ethiopia and the former Soviet Union in the 1980s and 90s, as well as the global increase of international business travel, the existing facilities became painfully inadequate, prompting the design of a new state-of-the-art terminal that could also accommodate the expected tourism influx for the 2000 millennium celebrations. The decision to go ahead with the project was reached in January 1994, but the new terminal, known as Terminal 3, only opened its doors a decade later, on 2 November 2004. During a conflict with Gaza in July 2014, several airlines banned their flights to the airport for a couple of days.

The furthest nonstop flight to have departed the airport was a private Airbus A340-500 owned by billionaire casino mogul Sheldon Adelson who flew on 2 January 2017 to Honolulu on a route over the Arctic Ocean. The flight was projected to last 17 hours and 40 minutes.

Ramon Airport, an international airport near the southern Israeli city of Eilat, serves as a diversion airport for Ben Gurion Airport.

Passenger terminals

Terminal 1

History
Prior to the opening of Terminal 3, Terminal 1 was the main terminal building at Ben Gurion Airport. At that time, the departures check-in area was located on the ground floor. From there, passengers proceeded upstairs to the main departures hall, which contained passport control, duty-free shops, VIP lounges, one synagogue and boarding gates. At the gates, travelers would be required to descend a flight of stairs to return to the ground floor where waiting shuttle buses transported them to airplanes on the tarmac. The arrivals hall with passport control, luggage carousels, duty-free pick-up and customs was located at the south end of the building. After Terminal 3 opened, Terminal 1 was closed except for domestic flights to the airport in Eilat and government flights such as special immigrant flights from North America and Africa. Chartered flights organised by Nefesh B'Nefesh carrying immigrants from North America and England use this terminal for their landing ceremonies several times a year.

Although Terminal 1 was closed between 2003 and 2007, the building served as a venue for various events and large-scale exhibitions including the "Bezalel Academy of Arts Centennial Exhibition" which was held there in 2006.
The renovations for the terminal were designed by Yosef Assa with three individual atmospheric themes. Firstly, the public halls have a Land-of-Israel character with walls painted in the colors of Israel's Judean, Jerusalem and Galilee mountains. The Departure Hall is given an atmosphere of vacation and leisure, whilst the Arrivals Hall is given a more urban theme as passengers return to the city.

In February 2006, the Israel Airports Authority announced plans to invest 4.3 million NIS in a new VIP wing for private jet passengers and crews, as well as others interested in avoiding the main terminal. VIP ground services already exist, but a substantial increase in users has justified expanding the facilities, which will also boost airport revenues. The IAA released figures showing significant growth in private jet flights (4,059, a 36.5% increase from 2004) as well as private jet users (14,613, a 46.2% increase from 2004). The new VIP wing, operated by an outside licensee, will be located in an upgraded and expanded section of Terminal 1. All flight procedures (security check, passport control and customs) will be handled here. This wing will include a hall equipped for press conferences, a deluxe lounge, special meeting rooms equipped with state-of-the-art business facilities and a designated lounge for flight crews who spend time at the airport between flights. It was announced in January 2008, however, that the IAA planned to construct a new 1000square metre VIP terminal next to Terminal 3.

International low-cost and domestic terminal

Terminal 1 was closed in 2003 and re-opened in 2007 as the domestic terminal following extensive renovations, and in July 2008, to cater for summer charter and low-cost flights. It remained open for these charter and low-cost flights for the 2008 summer season then temporarily closed in October 2008, when it underwent further renovation and reopened again in Summer 2009, when it was expected to reach a three-month capacity of 600,000 passengers on international flights. As of 2010, several low-cost carriers' international flights were operating out of Terminal 1 year-round including Vueling flights to Barcelona and easyJet flights to London (Luton), Manchester, Geneva, and Basel. In 2015, due to increased demand and following another expansion of the terminal, the Israel Airports Authority made Terminal 1 available to all low-cost carriers under certain conditions. Flights operating out of Terminal 1 are charged lower airport fees than those operating out of Terminal 3.

Until the summer of 2017 Terminal 1 was used for flight check-in, security screening and passport-control for international flights for passengers of certain low-cost airlines, but following passport control passengers were bussed to the departures concourse of Terminal 3 from which they boarded their flights. All incoming flights for airlines operating out of Terminal 1 were handled in Terminal 3. However, beginning on 19 June 2017 and following several months of renovations, Terminal 1 passengers began being bussed directly to their flights from Terminal 1, although incoming passengers continue to be handled in Terminal 3. The renovations to Terminal 1's boarding area included adding duty-free shops, restaurants and cafes. The terminal was also equipped with advanced checked-baggage handling and screening systems, similar to those in Terminal 3.

A free public shuttle from Terminal 3 and the railway station to and from Terminal 1 operates approximately every 15 to 30 minutes (depending on the time of day).

Terminal 3

Terminal 3, which opened on 28 October 2004, replaced Terminal 1 as the main international gateway to and from Israel. The building was designed by Skidmore, Owings & Merrill (SOM). Moshe Safdie & Associates and TRA (now Black and Veatch) designed a linking structure and the airside departure areas and gates. Ram Karmi and other Israeli architects were the local architects of record. The inaugural flight was an El Al flight to John F. Kennedy International Airport in New York City.

Work on Natbag 2000, as the Terminal 3 project was known, was scheduled for completion prior to 2000 in order to handle a massive influx of pilgrims expected for the Millennium celebrations. This deadline was not met due to higher than anticipated costs and a series of work stoppages in the wake of the bankruptcy of the main Turkish contractor. The project eventually cost an estimated one billion US dollars. Due to the proximity of the airport to the country's largest population centres and the problem of noise pollution, another international airport is being considered to be built elsewhere in the country, such as the new Ilan and Assaf Ramon Airport in Southern Israel.

The overall layout of Terminal 3 is similar to that of airports in Europe and North America, with multiple levels and considerable distances to walk after disembarking from the aircraft. The walk is assisted by escalators and moving walkways. A small shopping mall, known as Buy & Bye, is open to both travellers and the general public. The mall, which includes shops, restaurants and a post office, was planned to be a draw for non-flyers too. On the same level as the mall, passengers enter passport control and the security check. Planes taking off and landing can be viewed from a distinctive tilted glass wall. The arrivals hall is located on the ground floor where there are also 20 additional check-in counters (serving Star Alliance airlines). Car rental counters are located in an intermediate level situated between the departing and arriving passenger halls. Terminal 3 has two synagogues.

After the main security check, passengers wait for their flights in the star-shaped duty-free rotunda. A variety of cafes, restaurants and duty-free shops are located there, open 24 hours a day, as well as a synagogue, banking facilities, a transit hall for connecting passengers and a desk for VAT refunds.

Terminal 3 has a total of 40 gates divided among four concourses (B, C, D, and E), each with 8 jet bridge-equipped gates (numbered 2 through 9), as well as two stand gates (bus bays 1 and 1A) from which passengers are ferried to aircraft. Two gates in concourse E utilize dual jet bridges for more efficient processing of very large widebody aircraft. Concourses B, C, and D were opened when terminal 3 opened in 2004, while concourse E was completed in 2018. Space exists for one additional concourse (A) at Terminal 3.

Free wireless internet is provided throughout the terminal.
The terminal has three business lounges—the exclusive El Al King David Lounge for frequent flyers and three Dan lounges for either privileged or paying flyers.

In January 2007, the IAA announced plans for a 120-bed hotel to be located about 300 m west of Terminal 3. The tender for the hotel was published by the IAA in late 2017. The winning bidder will construct and operate the hotel for a period of 25 years.

Former and unopened terminals

Terminal 2
Terminal 2 was inaugurated in 1969 when Arkia resumed operations at the airport after the Six-Day War. Terminal 2 served domestic flights until 20 February 2007 when these services moved into the refurbished Terminal 1. Due to increased traffic in the late 1990s and over-capacity reached at Terminal 1, an international section was added until Terminal 3 was opened. After the transfer of domestic services to Terminal 1, Terminal 2 was demolished in order to make room for additional air freight handling areas.

Terminal 4
This terminal, built in 1999, was meant to handle the crowds expected in 2000, but never officially opened. To date, it has only been used as a terminal for passengers arriving from Asia during the SARS epidemic.
Another use for the terminal was for the memorial ceremonies upon the arrival of the casket of Col. Ilan Ramon after the Space Shuttle Columbia disaster in February 2003 and the arrival of Elhanan Tannenbaum and the caskets of three Israeli soldiers from Lebanon in January 2004.

Future development
In December 2017, the IAA announced a long-term expansion plan for Ben Gurion Airport estimated to cost approximately NIS 9 billion. Plans include further expansion of Terminal 1, a new dedicated domestic flights terminal, a major expansion of Terminal 3's landside terminal which would add approximately 90 additional check-in counters, construction of Concourse A, and additional aircraft parking spaces and ramps. In addition, air cargo facilities would be relocated to a large, currently-unused tract of land in the northern part of the airport's property (north of runway 08/26) where additional aircraft maintenance facilities would also be built.

In the meantime, to ease immediate overcrowding problems at Terminal 3's landside terminal, in the Spring of 2018 a temporary large, air-conditioned tent was erected adjacent to Terminal 3 housing 25 check-in counters and security screening facilities. This tent was used for compulsory COVID-19 testing for all arriving passengers between 2020 and 2022.

In August 2018, the IAA published a tender for the construction and operation of a new terminal, dedicated to handling private and executive aircraft traffic.

In late 2021 construction began on a new interchange that will provide additional access to the airport from Highway 1. The new interchange will significantly reduce the distance vehicles must travel to access the airport's main terminal from the direction of Tel Aviv and other points north and west of the airport.

Office buildings
The Airport City development, a large office park, is located east of the main airport property. It is at the junction of the Jerusalem and Tel Aviv metropolitan areas.

The head office of El Al is located at Ben Gurion Airport, as is the head office of the Israel Airports Authority.

The head offices of the Civil Aviation Authority and CAL Cargo Air Lines are located in the Airport City office park nearby the airport.

In addition, Israel Aerospace Industries also maintains its head office on airport grounds as well as extensive aviation construction and repair facilities.

Runways

Main runway
The closest runway to terminals 1 and 3 is 12/30,  in length, and is followed by a taxiway. Most landings take place on this runway from West to East, approaching from the Mediterranean Sea over southern Tel Aviv. During inclement weather, it may also be used for takeoffs (Direction 12). A 17 million NIS renovation project was completed in November 2007 which reinforced the runway and made it suitable for future wide-body aircraft. In September 2008, a new ILS serving the runway was activated. The main runway was closed from 2011 until early 2014 in order to accommodate the extension of runway 03/21 and other construction activity in the vicinity of the runway.

Short runway
At the time it mainly served cargo aircraft of the Israeli Air Force and as a taxiway for runway 26. However, by late 2011, the runway was closed and most of the activity in the military apron to the east of the runway was permanently relocated to the Nevatim Airbase in southern Israel. It is equipped with an ILS and mostly handles landings from north to south.

Quiet runway
The longest runway at the airfield, and the main take off runway from east to west (direction 08/26), is referred to as "the quiet runway" since jets taking off in this direction produce less noise pollution for surrounding residents. A 24 million NIS renovation project completed in February 2006 reinforced the runway and made it suitable for wide-body aircraft such as Airbus A380.

History and development
The original layout of the airfield as designed by the British in the 1930s included four intersecting 800 m runways suitable for the piston engined aircraft of the day. However, none of this original layout is visible nowadays since as usage increased and aircraft types and needs changed over the years various runways on the airport's premises were built and removed.

The main runway (12/30) is the oldest surviving runway in the airport, with the quiet (08/26) and short (03/21) runways having been built in the late 1960s and 1970s. Since very little commercial traffic could operate on the short runway, it meant that for approximately forty years, the airport mostly relied on runways 12/30 and 08/26. This presented a problem however; the fact that these two runways intersect near their western end creates a crisscross pattern between aircraft landing and taking off. This pattern reduces the number of aircraft which can arrive to and depart from the airport and has detrimental safety implications as well.

With passenger traffic projected to increase, plans were drawn in the 1980s and 90s for the extension of runways 03/21 and 08/26 as a means of alleviating some of Ben Gurion's safety and capacity concerns. These plans were approved in 1997 and construction began in 2010. The extension of runway 03/21 allows the airport to operate in an "open V" configuration, allowing for simultaneous landings and take offs on runways 08/26 and 03/21 and thus more than double the number of aircraft movements which can be handled at peak times, while increasing the overall level of air safety in and around the airport. Construction took four years and cost 1 billion NIS (financed from the Israeli Airports Authority budget) and was completed 29 May 2014. It included paving 22 kilometers of runways and taxiways, using more than 1.5 million tons of asphalt, laying one million meters of runway lighting cables, 50,000 meters of high-voltage power lines and 10,000 light fixtures. The construction of several new taxiways between the existing runways and terminals also significantly reduced taxi times at the airport.

Citizen objections
While Ben Gurion Airport is conveniently located in the very center of the country, this fact also means that the airport is surrounded by various residential communities who often complain of noise pollution caused by the airport. Following the completion of the extension of runway 03/21, residents north of the airport sued the Israeli aviation authorities claiming that the authorities intend to use the runway to a greater degree than was originally agreed with them during the approval process for the airport runways' reconfiguration project.

Security procedures

Overview
Security at Ben Gurion International Airport operates on several levels.

All cars, taxis, buses and trucks go through a preliminary security checkpoint before entering the airport compound. Armed guards spot-check the vehicles by looking into cars, taxis and boarding buses, exchanging a few words with the driver and passengers. Armed security personnel stationed at the terminal entrances keep a close watch on those who enter the buildings. If someone arouses their suspicion or looks nervous, they may strike up a conversation to further assess the person's intent. Plainclothes armed personnel patrol the area outside the building, and hidden surveillance cameras operate at all times. Inside the building, both uniformed and plainclothes security officers are on constant patrol. Departing passengers are personally questioned by security agents even before arriving at the check-in desk. This interview can last as little as a minute, or as long as an hour if a passenger is selected for additional screening. Luggage and body searches may be conducted.

Until August 2007, there was a system of color codes on checked baggage but the practice was discontinued after complaints of discrimination. In the past, checked baggages were screened following the personal interview and before passengers arrived at the check-in desks. Occasionally, if security assessed a person as a low risk, they were passed straight through to the check-in desks, bypassing the main X-ray machines, a practice which also drew some discrimination complaints. This process ceased in April 2014 when the main X-ray machines were removed from the passenger queuing area in terminal 3 and baggage screening began being performed after the baggage was checked-in by airline representatives (as is common in most airports around the world). Terminal 1 began using the same procedure in summer 2017.

Baggage screening
After check-in, all checked baggage is screened using sophisticated X-ray and CT scanners and put in a pressure chamber to trigger any possible explosive devices. Following the check-in process, passengers continue to personal security and passport control. Before passing through the metal detectors and putting carry-on baggage through the X-ray machine at the security checkpoint, passports and boarding passes are re-inspected and additional questions may be asked. Before boarding the aircraft, passports and boarding passes are verified once again. Security procedures for incoming flights are not as stringent, but passengers may be questioned by passport control depending on country of origin, or countries visited prior to arrival in Israel. Passengers who have recently visited Arab countries are subject to further questioning.

Airlines and destinations

Passenger
The following airlines serve regular scheduled and charter destinations at Ben Gurion Airport.

Cargo

Statistics

Commercial flights from Sde Dov Airport which, until its closure in July 2019, handled more domestic passengers annually than TLV have been moved to Ben Gurion.

Top destinations by number of passengers

Ground transportation
The airport is located near Highway 1, the main Jerusalem–Tel Aviv Highway and Highway 40. The airport is accessible by car or public bus. Israel Railways operates train service from the airport to several parts of the country and taxi stands are located outside the arrivals building. A popular transportation option is a share taxi van, known in Hebrew as a monit sherut (service cab), going to Jerusalem, Haifa and Beersheba.

Public transport
Israel has an integrated nationwide public transport payment system covering multiple transit options (train, bus and light rail) run by various operators using a single payment card: the Rav-Kav. It features flexible tariff arrangements and offers free transfers between transit methods within certain geographical zones and time periods. A public transport information office which also issues Rav-Kav cards is located in the arrivals hall of Terminal 3. With a few exceptions, most public transport options (except for taxis and service cabs) do not operate on the Sabbath (i.e., from early Friday evenings to late Saturday evenings as well as certain Jewish holidays).

A new app payment system was introduced in December 2020. The app has a different, simpler fare system (that can be more expensive in some cases and cheaper in others) and it's post pay (The Rav Kav is a pre-paid card that you need to top up). The charge is at the end of each month (so a registration and a payment method are required). There are four available apps: the government-owned app called "The Station" (Hataḥana) and three private ones—RavPass (by HopOn), ANYWAY (by Isracard) and Moovit (by Moovit and Pango).

Rail

Israel Railways operates the Ben Gurion Airport Railway Station, located in the lower level of Terminal 3. From this station passengers may head northwest to Tel Aviv, Haifa and other destinations in the north, or southeast to Modi'in and Jerusalem. The journey to Tel Aviv Savidor Central railway station takes about 18 minutes and to Jerusalem's Yitzhak Navon station about 25 minutes. There is also late night/early morning train service to and from the airport terminating at Beersheba Center via Lod, Ashkelon and selected destinations in between. Almost 3.3 million passengers used the railway line to and from the airport in 2009. The service does not operate on Shabbat and Jewish holidays but on all other days it runs day and night. The line to Nahariya through Tel Aviv and Haifa operated 24 hours a day on weekdays, but these services were suspended following the COVID-19 pandemic and put on hold until railway electrification works are completed in the mid-2020s, following which the line would run from Jerusalem and terminate at Karmiel instead of Nahariya (though it would continue to service Tel Aviv and Haifa).

Bus or taxi
The airport is served by regular inter-city bus lines, limousine and private shuttle services, Sherut "shared" door to door taxi vans and regular taxis. Afikim bus company provides 24 hours a day, on the hour, direct service to Jerusalem with line 485. the line departs from Terminal 3 on the 2nd floor and passes through Terminal 1. Egged bus number 5 ferries passengers between the terminals and a small bus terminal in the nearby Airport City business park near El Al junction just outside the airport where they can connect to regular Egged bus routes passing through the area. Passengers connecting at Airport City can pay for both rides on the same ticket, not having to pay an extra fare for bus No. 5. Other bus companies directly serve Terminal 3, and the airport also provides a free shuttle bus between terminals. On Shabbat, when there is no train service, a shared shuttle service is available between the airport and Tel Aviv hotels.

Car
Located on Highway 1, the Jerusalem – Tel Aviv highway, the airport has a total of approximately 20,000 parking spaces for short and long-term parking. The spaces for long-term parking are situated several kilometres from the terminal, and are reached by a free shuttle bus. Car rental at the airport is available from Avis, Budget, Eldan, Tamir Rental, Thrifty, Hertz and Shlomo Sixt.

Service quality

Passenger rankings
In December 2006, Ben Gurion International Airport ranked first among 40 European airports and 8th out of 77 airports in the world, in a survey, conducted by Airports Council International, to determine the most customer-friendly airport. Tel Aviv placed second in the grouping of airports which carry between 5 and 15 million passengers per year behind Japan's Nagoya Airport. The survey consisted of 34 questions. A random sampling of 350 passengers at the departure gate were asked how satisfied they were with the service, infrastructure and facilities. Ben Gurion received a rating of 3.94 out of 5, followed by Vienna, Munich, Amsterdam, Brussels, Zürich, Copenhagen and Helsinki. The airport retained its title as the best Middle Eastern airport in the 2007, 2008 and 2009 surveys.

Awards

Notes

References

External links
Official website

 

1934 establishments in Mandatory Palestine
Airports established in 1934
Airports in Israel
Buildings and structures in Central District (Israel)
Lod
Skidmore, Owings & Merrill buildings
Commemoration of David Ben-Gurion